"Hope She Cheats on You (With a Basketball Player)" is a song by English recording artist Marsha Ambrosius. It was released on August 13, 2010 as the lead single from her debut studio album, Late Nights & Early Mornings.

Background
The song was written and produced by Marsha Ambrosius and Canei Finch. Ambrosius describes the song as "the reality of a bad breakup" and also said, "We wanna be decent human beings and say the right thing, you know, 'I wish you well.' But this is 'Everything that could go wrong for him, I want it to because my ego is bruised and I’m acting out." Ambrosius wrote the song on behalf of a friend who experienced a bad break-up. "I couldn't let it go," she states.

Remix
The official remix features rappers Fabolous and Maino. It was released on 23 September 2010.

Charts

References

2010 singles
Marsha Ambrosius songs
Songs written by Marsha Ambrosius
2010 songs
J Records singles